The African Meeting House, also known variously as First African Baptist Church, First Independent Baptist Church and the Belknap Street Church, was built in 1806 and is now the oldest black church edifice still standing in the United States. It is located in the Beacon Hill neighborhood of Boston, Massachusetts, adjacent to the African-American Abiel Smith School. It is a National Historic Landmark.

History

Church

Before 1805, although black Bostonians could attend white churches, they generally faced discrimination. They were assigned seats only in the balconies and were not given voting privileges.

Thomas Paul, an African-American preacher from New Hampshire, led worship meetings for blacks at Faneuil Hall. Paul, with twenty of his members, officially formed the First African Baptist Church on August 8, 1805. In the same year, land was purchased for a building. The African Meeting House, as it came to be commonly called, was completed the next year. At the public dedication on December 6, 1806, the first-floor pews were reserved for all those "benevolently disposed to the Africans," while the black members sat in the balcony of their new meeting house.

Ministers
 Thomas Paul, c. 1805–1829
 John Peck, c. 1830
 Washington Christian, c. 1831
 Thomas Ritchie, c. 1832
 Samuel Gooch, c. 1833–1834
 John Given, c. 1835
 Armstrong W. Archer, c. 1837
 George H. Black, c. 1838–1840
 John T. Raymond, c. 1841–1845
 William B. Serrington, c. 1848–1849
 William Thompson, c. 1851–1853
 Thomas Henson, c. 1856–1858
 J. Sella Martin, c. 1860–1862
 H. H. White, c. 1864

School (1806–1835)
In the early 1800s, Primus Hall had established a school in his home. He sought funding from the community, including African-American sailors, to pay for expenses to run the school. Unsuccessful in attempts to establish a public school with the city of Boston in 1800, he moved his school to the African Meeting House by 1806. Hall continued fund-raising to support the African-American school until 1835.

Besides inspiring Boston's African Americans to pursue justice and quality in education, the school offered them opportunities for employment and economic growth, which in turn provided funds for future generations of African-American Bostonians to pursue higher education.

The Abiel Smith School was built in 1834 following the donation of $2,000 by Abiel Smith. The primary and grammar school was the first building built as a public school for African Americans in the country. In 1835, all black children in Boston were assigned to the Smith school, which replaced the basement school in the African Meeting House.

Civic activities (1832 and Civil War) 
The African Meeting House became known as the Black Faneuil Hall during the abolitionist movement. On January 6, 1832, William Lloyd Garrison founded the New England Anti-Slavery Society here. During the Civil War, Frederick Douglass and others recruited soldiers here for the 54th and 55th Massachusetts Regiments.

Synagogue (late 19th century – 1972)
At the end of the 19th century, when the black community began to migrate to the South End and Roxbury, the building was sold to a Jewish congregation, Anshei Lubavitch. They were the new immigrants in the city and living on Beacon Hill and in the North End. It served as a synagogue until 1972, when it was acquired by the Museum of African American History and adapted as a museum.

Museum (c. 1972–present)
It was declared a National Historic Landmark in 1974.

The African Meeting House houses the Museum of African American History, which is a museum "dedicated to preserving, conserving and accurately interpreting the contributions of African Americans in New England from the colonial period through the 19th century," according to the Museum's website. The African Meeting House is open to the public. This site is part of Boston African American National Historic Site.

Adjacent to the African Meeting House, is the Education and Technology Center.  The Trust for Public Land assisted in the acquisition of the building when the museum needed space to expand.

Construction and remodeling

Funds for the African Meeting House were raised in both the white and black communities. Cato Gardner, a native of Africa, was responsible for raising more than $1,500 toward the total $7,700 to complete the meeting house. A commemorative inscription above the front door reads: "Cato Gardner, first Promoter of this Building 1806." Scipio and Sylvia Dalton also helped organize and raise money to build the church.

Although the building committee was able to secure $2,500 for the church, the congregation and the committee were compelled to ask the Massachusetts legislation for funds to complete construction. This funding request required an accounting of persons who worked on and supplied materials to the construction project and documents that both African-American and white laborers contributed to it. This accounting lists, for example, that the white carpenter Amos Penniman worked on the African Meeting House. This research has not yet located this document, but it does substantiate that Abel Barbadoes did masonry work on the building, as Chloe Thomas, then a resident of the Home for Aged Colored Women, told George Ruffin in 1883:

I heard from the lips of some of our most honored fathers, Cato Gardner, Father Primus Hall, Hamlet Earl, Scipio Dalton, Peter G. Smith, G.H. Holmes, that George Holmes made the first hod to carry bricks and mortar that was ever used in Boston. He invented it for the purpose of carrying bricks and mortar to build our meeting house with as he was a mason and calculated to do his part to the best of his ability. And Boston Smith, father of P.G. Smith, with the rest of his devoted brothers, was anxious to do all in his power. As Boston Smith was a master builder, he led the carpentry department...Abel Barbadoes, being a master mason also assisted. He was the father of Mrs. Catherine Barbadoes at 27 Myrtle Street.

The façade of the African Meeting House is an adaptation of a design for a townhouse published by Boston architect Asher Benjamin. In addition to its religious and educational activities, the meeting house became a place for celebrations and political and anti-slavery meetings. The African Meeting House was remodeled by the congregation in the 1850s.

See also
 List of museums focused on African Americans
 List of National Historic Landmarks in Boston
 National Register of Historic Places listings in northern Boston, Massachusetts
 Thomas Dalton
 James George Barbadoes
 Twelfth Baptist Church, Boston
 History of African Americans in Boston

References

Further reading
 Paul Dean. A discourse delivered before the African Society, at their meeting-house, in Boston, Mass. on the abolition of the slave trade by the government of the United States of America, July 14, 1819. Boston: Nathaniel Coverly, 1819.
 George A. Levesque. "Inherent Reformers-Inherited Orthodoxy: Black Baptists in Boston, 1800-1873". Journal of Negro History, Vol. 60, No. 4 (October 1975), pp. 491–525.

External links

African Meeting House
Museum of African American History website
New York Times article mentioning African-American history-oriented tourism in Boston

19th century in Boston
Abolitionism in the United States
African-American history in Boston
African-American museums in Massachusetts
Asher Benjamin buildings
Baptist churches in Boston
Beacon Hill, Boston
Churches on the Underground Railroad
Culture of Boston
Museums in Boston
National Historic Landmarks in Boston
Churches on the National Register of Historic Places in Massachusetts
Churches completed in 1806
1806 establishments in Massachusetts
Historic district contributing properties in Massachusetts
First African Baptist churches
National Register of Historic Places in Boston